Christopher Luke Tardif (born 19 September 1979) is an English former professional footballer, who is currently the first team coach of the Guernsey Rangers Priaulx side. He has represented Northern Ireland at youth level, through a now closed loophole in the Home Nations agreement, and Guernsey at senior level.

Career
Tardif began his career in Guernsey with Vale Recreation F.C. before joining Portsmouth, turning professional in the 1998 close season. He joined Havant & Waterlooville on loan in August 1999, playing in the first eight league games of Havants' first season in the Southern League Premier Division. He also had a spell on loan with Newport (Isle of Wight) from March to May 2000 and finally made his Portsmouth debut in their 2–1 defeat at home to Tranmere in the FA Cup on 6 January 2001. He made four further appearances for Portsmouth that season, all in the Championship as Portsmouth successfully avoided relegation. His only other appearance for Portsmouth came on 27 August 2001 when Tardif played in their 4–1 win at home to Grimsby Town.

He spent the 2002–03 season on loan with AFC Bournemouth, playing 14 games in all competitions and, after a spell on loan with Newport (Isle of Wight), in October 2003 joined Havant & Waterlooville on a month's loan, as cover for the injured Gareth Howells.

Released by Portsmouth, he joined Oxford United in May 2004, on a two-year contract. He was a regular the following season. However, he found first-team football hard to come by in later seasons, particularly under Jim Smith when Billy Turley kept him out of the side to the extent that he had a transfer request accepted by Oxford in December 2006. In September 2007, he retired from professional football to start a new career, although planned to continue playing semi-professionally.

Tardif played one game as a triallist for Eastleigh in October 2007, and joined Basingstoke Town in December 2007, moving to Maidenhead United in March 2008. He was an integral part of the Maidenhead side that narrowly avoided relegation at the end of the season, Tardif keeping four sheets in the final five games. He became a father shortly after the end of the season and chose to reduce the time spent travelling from his Portsmouth home by joining Farnborough in May 2008. He joined Bognor Regis Town in September 2008. He returned to Maidenhead United in the summer of 2009.

On 2 June 2010, Tardif rejoined Basingstoke Town. On 26 August 2010, Tardif had his Basingstoke Town contract terminated by mutual consent and returned to his home island, signing with St. Martins A.C.

Joining Guernsey F.C. when it was formed in 2011, Chris became Captain in 2016 following the resignation of Sam Cochrane, however in October 2016 Tardif suffering a double leg break at the home match against Godalming Town F.C. which will see him out of the team, probably for the rest of the season.

On February 28, 2022, Tardif was announced as the new First Team Coach for Guernsey Rangers for the next Priaulx League Season, starting August 2022.

International career
A loophole in the FIFA statutes, which has now been closed, allowed footballers who were British citizens, but born outside the UK, to play for any home nation, regardless of whether or not they have any previous connection to it. As none of the Channel Islands are affiliated to FIFA — although have county football association status within England's Football Association — and Tardif was born in Guernsey, he was therefore eligible to play for any home nation, and represented Northern Ireland at U19 level. He was called into the U21 squad in September 2001, for a European Championship qualifier against Malta, but did not play.

Since returning to Guernsey, Tardif has represented Guernsey, in the 2011 Muratti Vase Final, losing on penalties to Jersey, at the 2011 Island Games and then won the 2012 Muratti Vase Final after Guernsey beat Jersey by two goals to nil Also, in 2011 Tardiff joined the newly formed Guernsey F.C. as their goalkeeper. In 2012, he played one match as a forward for Media United in the Guernsey FA Cup to ensure his eligibility for the Muratti.

References

External links

1981 births
Living people
Portsmouth F.C. players
Vale Recreation F.C. players
AFC Bournemouth players
Havant & Waterlooville F.C. players
Oxford United F.C. players
Basingstoke Town F.C. players
Maidenhead United F.C. players
Farnborough F.C. players
Bognor Regis Town F.C. players
Guernsey footballers
Newport (IOW) F.C. players
Guernsey F.C. players
Association football goalkeepers